Marco Aurelio Soto (13 November 1846 – 25 February 1908) was President of Honduras from 27 August 1876 until 19 October 1883. He was known as a liberal. He was a reforming President and had a great impact on the Honduras of his time, including the establishment of the Biblioteca Nacional de Honduras in 1880, Marco Aurelio Soto was an important Mining business man.

Biography
Dr. Marco Aurelio Soto was born in Tegucigalpa, Honduras. His parents were Dr. and Mrs. Maximo Soto Francisca Martínez. When he was nine years old he moved with his father, Dr. Don Maximo Soto to Guatemala, where he studied with brilliant success, and crowned his career as a lawyer.

As a very young man began to draw attention to their well-written literary and political articles, the latter inspired by the principles proclaimed by the revolution of 1871. General Justo Rufino Barrios Soto called Soto to the duties of a Sub-secretary of state, where he revealed remarkable talent. Shortly after the minister himself was relieved of office, Soto stayed in charge of the Ministry of the Interior, Justice and Ecclesiastical Affairs, to which he was soon permanently appointed.

Later he took on the duties of the Ministries of Foreign Affairs and Public Instruction. In this last position he organized the first public primary, secondary and vocational instruction to be founded on modern principles. In 1876, Soto was appointed Minister Plenipotentiary to Guatemala, To secure peace between Guatemala and El Salvador, a mission which he completed successfully, and signed the Soto-Ulloa Treaty in Santa Ana on 8 May.

Marco Aurelio Soto ruled Honduras in different periods. In 1876 he served as interim president. In 1877 he was constitutional president, a period that lasted until 1883 after his re-election. During his administration and with the assistance of Ramon Rosa, Soto launched liberal reforms. These reforms included administrative, political, economic and social attempts to alleviate the disastrous situation of Honduras.

President Soto sought to improve lines of communication and mail service, including building some railroads, a telegraph system and launched an unprecedented education program in the country. In addition, he moved the capital to Tegucigalpa. Despite the progress made during the administration Soto, Honduras remained quite underdeveloped as it lacked export products like coffee to pay for the investment necessary to improve infrastructure.

Soto's presidency was threatened by the Guatemalan government of Justo Rufino Barrios, and for this reason he fled the country, leaving it in the hands of a council of ministers.

1846 births
1908 deaths
People from Tegucigalpa
Honduran people of Spanish descent
Liberal Party of Honduras politicians
Presidents of Honduras
Honduran emigrants to Guatemala
Ambassadors of Honduras to Guatemala